The 2017 WPL All-Stars were the inaugural All-Star team for the Women's Premier League. There were no players from the Berkeley All Blues on the roster in 2017.

Coaching Staff 

 James English - New York Rugby Club
 Beckett Royce - Oregon Rugby Sports Union

Players

References

Women's Premier League Rugby All-Stars Rosters